Glyceria acutiflora, the creeping mannagrass, is a perennial grass found in the north-eastern United States and in north-eastern Asia. Its specific epithet acutiflora means "acute-flowered". It has a diploid number of 40.

Description

Its leaf sheaths overlap each other, with the highest overlapping the base of the panicle. The grass flowers from May to July and rarely into August.

The long paleas of G. acutiflora make it one of the most distinctive species of Glyceria in North America. When immature and still growing, the grass resembles Glyceria borealis.

Habitat and distribution

Glyceria acutiflora can be found growing in muddy pools and the margins of ponds from New Hampshire to Michigan and south to Tennessee and Missouri. The grass is a problematic weed in China, germinating over a wide range of temperatures and being resistant to osmotic and salt stress.

References

acutiflora
Plants described in 1840